The Clachaig Inn is a hotel and pub in Glen Coe, Lochaber, Highland, Scotland. It is popular with walkers and climbers who come to visit the surrounding mountains.

It lies at the foot of Clachaig Gully, a precarious descent route to the west of the Aonach Eagach ridge, and faces across the glen to the starkly vertical western shoulder of Bidean nam Bian.

The inn, dating back to the 16th century, more recently has a sign on its door saying "No hawkers or Campbells" in a wry reference to the Massacre of Glencoe which happened in Glencoe village. The village lay near the inn at the time of the massacre, but has since been relocated further west.

Nowadays the Clachaig Inn has three bars, serves food and has accommodation.

Sets for Made of Honour and the third Harry Potter film, Harry Potter and the Prisoner of Azkaban, were built in the area.

External links 
 Official Website

16th-century establishments in Scotland
Lochaber
Hotels in Highland (council area)
Pubs in Scotland
Glen Coe
Hotels established in the 16th century